Amelie Lux (born 5 April 1977) is a German windsurfer. She won a silver medal in the sailboard (Mistral) class at the 2000 Summer Olympics.

References

External links
 
 
 

1977 births
Living people
German windsurfers
Female windsurfers
German female sailors (sport)
Olympic sailors of Germany
Olympic silver medalists for Germany
Olympic medalists in sailing
Sailors at the 2000 Summer Olympics – Mistral One Design
Sailors at the 2004 Summer Olympics – Mistral One Design
Medalists at the 2000 Summer Olympics